This lists those feudal magnates (counts, dukes, and other sort of princes) who have held Halland (Hallandia) as fief, or its southern or northern part, as a substantive title.

Earl in Halland

 Charles Eriksen, maternal grandson of Canute IV of Denmark, son of Eric, Earl of Falster

Count of Halland

Knud Valdemarsen, joint king of Denmark from 1170, prince of Halland 1177–1182
Niels I, Count of Halland, 1218 (died the same year), bastard son of Valdemar II of Denmark

Count of Northern Halland

Duke Skule of Norway, fiefholder of Northern Halland 1228–1240
Niels II, Count of Northern Halland 1241–1251
James, Count of Halland (northern) 1283–1305
Eric, Duke of Södermanland, fiefholder of North Halland (seat in Varberg castle) 1310–1318

Duke of Northern Halland

Ingeborg of Norway, Duchess of North Halland 1312–1341 as Eric's consort and widow
Magnus, Duke, fiefholder of North Halland in 1318, king 1319 of Sweden and Norway and overlord of all of Terra Scania from 1332

Duke of Southern Halland

 Erik Knudsen Skarsholm(c. 1235–1304), Duke of Southern Halland 1284–1304, titularly of Reval, eldest son of Canute, Duke of Reval, Lolland and Blekinge, bastard son of Valdemar II of Denmark and grandson of Swedish Earl Guttorm
Christopher, brother of Eric VI of Denmark, Duke of Southern Halland 1307–1326

Canute Porse, second consort of Duchess Ingeborg (above), Duke of South Halland 1327–1330

Duke of Halland

 Ingeborg of Norway, Duchess now of all of Halland 1327–1341 as consort and widow (for South Halland's part) of Canute
 Canute Porse, Jr., Duke of Halland 1330–1350 holding the title simultaneously with his mother Ingeborg (above) and brother Hacon (below)
 Hacon Porse, Duke of Halland 1330–1350 holding the title simultaneously with his mother Ingeborg and brother Canute (above)
 Ingeborg of Norway (above), Duchess of Halland 1341–1353 in her own right
Benedict, Duke of Halland and Finland, Duke 1353–1357, died 1360
Prince Bertil, Duke of Halland 1912–1997
Princess Lilian, Duchess of Halland 1976–2013, prince Bertil's consort and widow
Prince Julian, Duke of Halland 2021–present

Coat of arms
The first known coat of arms of Halland consisted of a crowned heraldic leopard over 10 hearts and was used by Niels II and James I and most likely also by Niels I although no examples are preserved from the latter's reign. The colours of this first symbol are uncertain. In 1305, James used a seal showing a lion and 20 hearts. Knud Porse used his family's arms depicting three red sea leaves in a gold shield. One of the seals used by Duchess Ingeborg of Sweden, Halland, and Samsø represents Halland by an arms party per fess, with an unspecified colour in chief and a leopard in the larger lower base. This seal dates from 1336, and the figure was repeated in her seal used 1340–1352. A fresco in Søborg Castle, Denmark, dates from her stay there 1331–36 and shows the arms of Halland as a crowned upstanding silver lion on blue. This insignia Azure, a lion rampant Argent crowned Argent is closely related to the current arms of the province although the current lion is no longer crowned but has two tails.

From 1449–1972 a modified version Halland's first arms was represented in the coat of arms of Denmark now symbolizing the monarch's title King of the Goths. This title referred to the possession of the island Gotland. Occasionally, Gotland was represented in the Danish arms with an additional arms as well, an Agnus Dei.

Duke Benedict's personal escutcheon, from his family, depicted a lion of the Bjelbo dynasty.

References 

In-line:

General:
 Varberg – en kommuns historia, Varbergs kommun, 1993. Varberg: Carlssons Boktryckeri AB.

External links
One of the seals of Duchess Ingeborg

Halland
Halland
Halland
13th century in Sweden
14th century in Sweden
Dukedoms of Sweden
Halland
13th-century Swedish people
14th-century Swedish people